Luis Hurtado (1898–1967) was a Spanish film actor. He appeared in a mixture of Spanish and Italian films during his career. After appearing in leading roles in several Italian production of the Fascist era, he later returned to Spain where he appeared in films such as The Butterfly That Flew Over the Sea (1951).

Selected filmography
 L'ispettore Vargas (1940)
 The Betrothed (1941)
 Document Z-3 (1942)
 Captain Tempest (1942)
 The House of Rain (1943)
 Saturday Night (1950)
 Apollo Theatre (1950)
 The Butterfly That Flew Over the Sea (1951)
 Malibran's Song (1951)
 From Madrid to Heaven (1952)
 Judas' Kiss (1954)

References

Bibliography 
 Goble, Alan. The Complete Index to Literary Sources in Film. Walter de Gruyter, 1999.

External links 
 

1898 births
1967 deaths
Spanish male film actors
Male actors from Madrid